Olga Klimko (born 7 January 1960) is a Ukrainian equestrian. She competed at the 1988 Summer Olympics and the 1992 Summer Olympics.

References

1960 births
Living people
Soviet female equestrians
Ukrainian female equestrians
Ukrainian dressage riders
Olympic equestrians of the Soviet Union
Olympic equestrians of the Unified Team
Equestrians at the 1988 Summer Olympics
Equestrians at the 1992 Summer Olympics
Place of birth missing (living people)